Víctor Manuel Sojo Jiménez (born November 24, 1983 in Puente Genil, Córdoba) is a field hockey striker from Spain. He finished in fourth position with the Men's National Team at the 2004 Summer Olympics in Athens, Greece, and won the silver medal four years later in Beijing.

References
 Spanish Olympic Committee

External links
 

1983 births
Living people
Spanish male field hockey players
Male field hockey forwards
Olympic field hockey players of Spain
2002 Men's Hockey World Cup players
Field hockey players at the 2004 Summer Olympics
2006 Men's Hockey World Cup players
Field hockey players at the 2008 Summer Olympics
Olympic silver medalists for Spain
Medalists at the 2008 Summer Olympics
People from Campiña Sur (Córdoba)
Sportspeople from the Province of Córdoba (Spain)